Sigo Buscando ("Still Searching") is the second official single released from Alex Ubago's third studio album, Aviones de cristal (2006). The single was released in November 2006.

The music video was filmed in Istanbul, Turkey.

Chart positions

References

Spanish-language songs